Shulamit Ran (born October 21, 1949, in Tel Aviv, Israel) is an Israeli-American composer. She moved from Israel to New York City at 14, as a scholarship student at the Mannes College of Music. Her Symphony (1990) won her the Pulitzer Prize for Music.  In this regard, she was the second woman to win the Pulitzer Prize for Music, the first being Ellen Taaffe Zwilich in 1983. Ran was a professor of music composition at the University of Chicago from 1973 to 2015. She has performed as a pianist in Israel, Europe and the U.S., and her compositional works have been performed worldwide by a wide array of orchestras and chamber groups.

Biography

Early life
Born in Israel in 1949, Shulamit Ran began composing songs to Hebrew poetry at the age of seven. By the age of nine, she was studying composition with some of Israel's top composers, most notably Alexander Boskovich and Paul Ben-Haim. As a child, Jewish cantoral music played on the radio by her father had a huge impact on Ran. This is apparent in her opera Between Two Worlds-The Dybbuk.

She was able to continue her composition studies into her adult years with scholarships from Mannes College of Music in New York and the American Israel Cultural Foundation. In addition to piano, she studied composition with Norman Dello Joio and Ralph Shapey. While in the United States, studied piano with Nadia Reisenberg and Dorothy Taubman. During her time in the US, Shapey and composer Elliott Carter helped shape Ran's compositional voice, which was constantly changing.

Academic career
After studying with Shapey, he invited Ran to follow in his path of music education. In 1973, at the age of 26, Shulamit Ran joined the faculty at University of Chicago, where she eventually was named the Andrew MacLeish Distinguished Service Professor in the Department of Music, she also became the artistic director of Contempo (formerly the Contemporary Chamber Players).  Ran, whose students included Melinda Wagner, Suzanne Sorkin, Matt Malsky, Jonathan Elliott and Jorge Liderman, retired from her position at the University of Chicago in June 2015.  She also became a member of the American Academy of Arts and Letters, and the American Academy of Arts and Sciences.

About her works

Commissioned
Shulamit Ran's piece "Legends" was commissioned for the centennials of the Chicago Symphony Orchestra and University of Chicago.

Performed by
Shulamit Ran's works have been performed by many of the world's leading orchestras, including the New York Philharmonic, Israel Philharmonic, Chicago Symphony Orchestra, the Philadelphia Orchestra, the Cleveland Orchestra, the Jerusalem Orchestra, l'Orchestre de la Suisse Romande, the Amsterdam Philharmonic, the Baltimore Symphony, the National Symphony, the Orchestra of St. Lukes, and the American Composers Orchestra.

Ran's works have also been performed by Contemporary Chamber Players of the University of Chicago, Da Capo Chamber Players, Dolce Suono Ensemble, Network for New Music, the New York New Music Ensemble, the Contemporary Chamber Ensemble, Twentieth Century Consort, Monday Evenin Concerts in Los Angeles, Callisto Ensemble, both Collage and Musica Viva in Boston, the Chicago Symphony Orchestra's MusicNOW, the Pennsylvania Contemporary Players, the Mendelssohn String Quartet, the Lark Quartet the Penderecki Quartet, the Cassatt Quartet, the Peabody Trio, Musical Elements, San Francisco Contemporary Music Players, and Chamber Music Society of Lincoln Center.

Her music has been performed worldwide, in such places as the Library of Congress, the Kennedy Center, on "Music Today" in New York, and at the Tanglewood, Aspen, Santa Fe, and Yellow Barn summer festivals.

Works

Chamber ensemble
 A Prayer (1981) – Horn, Clarinet, Bass Clarinet, Bassoon, and Timpani
 Bach-Shards (2002) – String Quartet
 Chicago Skyline (1991) – Brass and Percussion
 Concerto da Camera I (1985) – Woodwind Quintet
 Concerto da Camera II (1987) – String Quartet and Piano
 Concerto da Camera III (Under the Sun's Gaze) (2003–2004)
 Double Vision (1976) – Two Quintets (Woodwinds and Brass) and Piano
 Excursions (1980) – Violin, Cello and Piano
 Fault Line (2005–2006) –
 String Quartet No. 3 – Glitter, Shards, Doom, Memory (2013) 
 Invocation (1994) for Horn, Timpani and Chimes
 Lyre of Orpheus (2009) for String Sextet with featured Cello solo
 Mirage (1990) for Five Players
 Moon Songs (2011) for Voice, Flute (doubling Piccolo), Cello, and Piano
 Private Game (1979) for Clarinet and Cello
 Soliloquy (1997) for Violin, Cello and Piano
 Sonatina (1961) for two flutes
 Song and Dance (2007) Duo for Saxophones and Percussion
 String Quartet No. 1 (1984) 
 String Quartet No.2 – Vistas (1988–89)

Instrumental solo
 Birds of Paradise (2014) for flute and piano
 East Wind (1987) for flute
 Fantasy Variations (1979, rev. 1984) for solo cello
 For an Actor (1978) monologue for clarinet
 Ha'llel (2005) for solo organ
 Hyperbolae (1976) for piano
 Inscriptions (1991) for solo violin
 Piano Sonata No. 2 (No date)
 Short Piano Pieces (No date)
 Sonata Walzer (1983) for piano
 Three Fantasy Pieces (1971) for cello and piano
 Three Scenes (2000) for clarinet
 Verticals (1982) for piano

Opera
 Between Two Worlds (The Dybbuk), opera in two acts (1997)

Orchestra
 Concert Piece (1970), for piano and orchestra
 Concerto for Orchestra (1986) 
 Legends for orchestra (1992–93, rev. 2001)
 The Show Goes On for Clarinet and Orchestra (Ha'hatzaga Nimshechet) (2008)
 Symphony (1989–90)
 Vessels of Courage and Hope, for orchestra (1998)
 Violin Concerto (2002–03)
 Voices (2000) for flautist with orchestra
 Yearning (1995) for violin and string orchestra

Transcriptions (Transcribed by Cliff Colnot)
 Fanfare for Brass (1991)
 Soliloquy II (2007) for Violin, Strings and Percussion
 Three Fantasy Movements (1993) for Cello and Orchestra

Vocal and Choral
 Adonai Malach (Psalm 93) (1985)
 Amichai Songs (1985)
 Apprehensions for Voice, Clarinet and Piano (1979)
 Credo/Ani Ma'amin (2006)
 Ensembles for 17 (1975) for Soprano and Instrumental Ensemble
 Fanfare for Multi-Tracked Sopranos (1981)
 Hatzvi Israel Eulogy (1969) for Mezzo-soprano, Flute, Harp, String Quartet
 O The Chimneys (Not Yet Released) for Mezzo-soprano and Chamber Ensemble.  "O, The Chimneys" is Side 2 of the Vox Turnabout LP TV-S 34492, with Gloria Davy, soprano (the first Black soprano to sing the role of Aida at The Metropolitan Opera); Shulamit Ran, piano; New York Philomusica Chamber Ensemble, A. Robert Johnson, conductor.
 Shirim L'Yom Tov (Four Festive Songs) (2003 and 2005) for a cappella choir
 Supplications for Chorus and Orchestra (no date)

Achievements
Shulamit Ran's achievements include fellowships and commissions from Martha Baird Rockefeller Fund, Ford Foundation, the National Endowment for the Arts, the Guggenheim Foundation, the Fromm Music Foundation, WFMT, Chamber Music America, the Serge Koussevitzky Music Foundation in the Library of Congress, the American Academy of Arts and Letters, Eastman School of Music, the American Composers Orchestra, the Chamber Music Society of Lincoln Center, the Philadelphia Orchestra, the Chicago Symphony Orchestra, the Baltimore Symphony, and many more.
 
Ran was named the Chicago Symphony Orchestra's second composer-in-residence and served from 1990 until 1997.  Her Symphony, performed in 1990, won her the Pulitzer Prize in 1991 and took first place as the Kennedy Center Friedheim Award. This makes her the second woman to win the Pulitzer Prize in music, the first being Ellen Taaffe Zwilich in 1983. She has received five honorary doctorates, and her works are published by Theodore Presser Company and the Israeli Music Institute. In addition to this, she has been recorded by more than 12 record labels.

References

Sources
Dunbar, Julie C. Women, Music, Culture: An Introduction. New York: Routledge, 2011. Print.
"Shulamit Ran, Composer." Weekend of Chamber Music. Web. <http://www.wcmconcerts.org/266 >.
"Shulamit Ran." Theodore Presser Company Music Publisher & Distributor. Web. <https://web.archive.org/web/20060101004642/http://www.presser.com/Composers/info.cfm?Name=SHULAMITRAN>.

External links
Shulamit Ran's page at Theodore Presser Company
 Shulamit Ran on the University of Chicago's website
 Art of the States: Shulamit Ran
 Shulamit Ran biography, analysis of compositional style and photograph on the site of Presser music publisher and distributor
 Two Interviews with Shulamit Ran, December 1, 1994 & June 1, 1997

1949 births
Living people
People from Tel Aviv
20th-century classical composers
University of Chicago faculty
Israeli emigrants to the United States
21st-century classical composers
Pulitzer Prize for Music winners
Women classical composers
Members of the American Academy of Arts and Letters
Mannes School of Music alumni
21st-century American composers
American classical composers
Israeli composers
20th-century American women musicians
20th-century American composers
21st-century American women musicians
20th-century women composers
21st-century women composers
Jewish opera composers
American women academics